The Oeffag C.I was a military reconnaissance aircraft produced in Austria-Hungary during World War I.

Development
The C.I model was established in 1915 in the Austrian-Hungarian Österreichische Flugzeugfabrik AG in Wiener Neustadt. The design of the aircraft was modeled on the German "C" series Albatros and Brandenburg airplanes. Oeffag CI did not meet the conditions necessary for the combat aircraft and the production of these machines was stopped after producing about 20 copies. In Austro-Hungarian aviation, CI aircraft were directed to aviation schools.

In Poland, there were probably four C.I aircraft, acquired in Małopolska. Two machines served in 7 EM (or EL *), and the other Aviation School in Kraków. Those who were withdrawn from service were probably in the second half of 1920 (from the 7th squadron already in autumn 1919).

Specifications

References

1910s Austro-Hungarian military reconnaissance aircraft
Biplanes
Single-engined tractor aircraft
Aircraft first flown in 1915
C.I